John Charles (born 4  November 1940) is a New Zealand film composer, conductor, and orchestrator. He created a number of musical works for the New Zealand cinema of the 1980s, 1990s and 2000s, including compositions for films such as Goodbye Pork Pie, Utu, The Quiet Earth, A Soldier's Tale or Spooked.

Life and career
Born in Wellington, Charles studied art at the Victoria University of Wellington. At the same time, he played jazz music in the university club. During his studies, he worked as a newspaper journalist and as a programmer for the New Zealand Broadcasting Service. With a Bachelor of Music degree, he returned to NZBC and worked as a producer and director. With experience directing a television play in 1973 and directing two episodes of a comedy series, he moved to Australia in 1974 and composed the music for his first television film, The God Boy.

The director with whom Charles worked most often in his career was jazz trumpeter and filmmaker Geoff Murphy. Their acquaintance dates back to 1966 and Murphy's first film, the unfinished children's musical The Magic Hammer. The two starred together as part of the 1970s touring group Blerta and on the Murphy-directed TV show of the same name. Together they turned to the realization of several New Zealand cinema projects in the late 1979s and early 1980s. While Murphy was directing, Charles composed the soundtracks to the films Goodbye Pork Pie, for which Charles wrote a jazz score, the Māori drama Utu, which has a predominantly symphonic score, and the dystopian, award-winning science fiction drama The Quiet Earth, in which he also processed avant-garde and experimental sounds in addition to symphonic ones. Director Murphy and leading actor Bruno Lawrence received several awards for the film The Quiet Earth, including the New Zealand Film and TV Award. Finally, in 2004, the mystery drama Spooked starring Cliff Curtis was created, the last joint work by Charles and Murphy.

In 1996, Charles joined the Australian Film and Broadcasting School as composer-in-residence, where he taught composition for more than a decade.

Select filmography
 1977: Wild Man
 1979: Jack Winter's Dream
 1980: Goodbye Pork Pie
 1983: Utu
 1984: Constance
 1985: The Quiet Earth
 1988: Zombie Brigade
 1989: A Soldier's Tale
 1993: Bread & Roses
 1994: The Last Tattoo
 2004: Spooked

References

External links
 

1940 births
Living people
People from Wellington City
New Zealand film score composers
Male film score composers
New Zealand classical composers
New Zealand music arrangers
New Zealand composers
Male television composers
New Zealand television composers
Male composers
Musicians from Wellington
20th-century composers
Male classical composers
Victoria University of Wellington alumni